Fiat Fastback is a concept 5-door coupe SUV by Fiat. It was first presented at 2018 São Paulo Motor Show and was scheduled to be produced by 2021.

References

Concept cars
Fiat concept vehicles